17K-AM was the name of a two-stage-to-orbit russian orbital launch vehicle projected in 1993, proposed by the Russian Air Force and to be constructed by Chelomey. It didn't pass the phase of study. The vehicle was to be composed by a Horizontal takeoff, horizontal landing launch stage with a spaceplane mounted on it that would reach orbit.

References 

Air launch to orbit
NPO Mashinostroyeniya products